Funeral Marches and Warsongs is a live DVD from the Swedish black metal band Marduk. Shot in 2003, the DVD contains footage of live performances in France, Poland and Germany, and two music videos.

Track listing

La Loco Paris, France (April 9, 2003) 

 "Blackcrowned"
 "With Satan And Victorious Weapons"
 "Azrael"
 "Wolves"
 "World Funeral"
 "Hearse"
 "Bleached Bones"
 "Of Hells Fire"
 "Darkness It Shall Be"
 "Fistfucking God's Planet"

Katowice, Poland (April 5, 2003) 

 "Blackcrowned"
 "With Satan And Victorious Weapons"
 "Azrael"
 "Wolves"
 "World Funeral"
 "Hearse"
 "Bleached Bones"
 "Of Hells Fire"
 "Darkness It Shall Be"
 "Fistfucking God's Planet"

Party.San Open Air, Germany (August 7, 2003) 

 "Jesus Christ Sodomized"
 "Baptism By Fire"
 "The Black"
 "Still Fucking Dead"

Music videos 

 "Hearse"
 "World Funeral"

References 

2004 video albums
Marduk (band) video albums
2004 live albums
Live video albums
Marduk (band) live albums